Christopher Holloway (born 5 February 1980) is a Welsh footballer.  He was born in Swansea.

Career

A Welsh former under-21 and current Welsh semi-professional international, Holloway started his career at Exeter City where he made over 60 appearances before joining Rotherham United in 2001. He has also played for Newport County, Tiverton Town and Merthyr Tydfil, where he was voted 2005 player of the year, leaving to join Llanelli in May 2007. He left the club in June 2012 after being released. In July 2012, Holloway signed for Haverfordwest County.

External links

Welsh Premier profile

References

Living people
1980 births
Footballers from Swansea
Welsh footballers
Exeter City F.C. players
Rotherham United F.C. players
Tiverton Town F.C. players
Newport County A.F.C. players
Merthyr Tydfil F.C. players
Llanelli Town A.F.C. players
English Football League players
Cymru Premier players
Association football midfielders
Haverfordwest County A.F.C. players